Fetz is a surname of German origin, meaning "scrap rag", referring to a sloppy or disorderly person. Notable people with the surname include:

Anita Fetz (born 1957), Swiss politician
Eberhard Fetz (born 1940), American neuroscientist, academic, and researcher
Friedrich Fetz (1927-2013), Austrian gymnast

See also
Fetz-Keller Ranch, a historic ranch near Montrose, Colorado